Pilgrim Society may refer to:
 Pilgrim Society, Massachusetts non-profit corporation which operates Pilgrim Hall Museum
 Pilgrims Society, an American-British honorary society